Epichostis microdelta is a moth in the family Xyloryctidae. It was described by Edward Meyrick in 1928. It is found in China.

References

Epichostis
Moths described in 1928